Yota Sato may refer to:
 Yota Sato (boxer)
 Yota Sato (footballer)